HMS Excalibur was the sister ship of , the two submarines being the only high-test peroxide (HTP) powered submarines to be constructed for the Royal Navy. She is the only ship to be named as such, in honour of the sword of Arthurian legend.

Operation
Both Excalibur and Explorer were assigned to the 3rd Submarine Squadron although due to their experimental nature, they tended to operate independently, accompanied by their depot ship HMS Kingfisher and a fuel carrier, RFA Spabeck.  They later acted as high-speed underwater targets for the Royal Navy's prototype nuclear-powered submarine .

Periscope

The submarine's periscope survives. It was installed in the starter's hut at the Golf House Club, the golf club at Elie and Earlsferry, Scotland; players and visitors may use it to view the golf course.

References

Bibliography

 

 

Explorer-class submarines
Ships built in Barrow-in-Furness
1955 ships
Cold War submarines of the United Kingdom